The law courts in ancient Athens (4th and 5th centuries BC) were a fundamental organ of democratic governance. According to Aristotle, whoever controls the courts controls the state.

These courts were jury courts and very large ones: the smallest possible had 200 members (+1 to avoid ties) and sometimes 501, 1000 or 1500. The annual pool of jurors, whose official name was Heliaia, comprised 6000 members. At least on one known occasion the whole six thousand sat together to judge a single case (a plenary session of the Heliaia). This was very different from Rome's laws, as in Rome, jury representatives were elected.  The Athenian jurors were chosen randomly by lot, which meant that juries would consist, in theory, of a wide range of members from different social classes. Jurors were chosen on an annual basis, as were all other offices within the state (with the exception of the generals, known as strategoi).
After the reforms of Solon in 594/3 BC, anyone from each of the four classes (the pentacosiomedimni, hippeis, zeugites and thetes) could become a juror. This was meant to make the system much fairer to the poorer members of society, who had previously been excluded in favour of the elitist aristocrats.

The archons who convened the courts had a purely administrative function and gave no legal direction or advice to the jurors: there was no judge but the jurors themselves.

From the time of Pericles onwards, jury pay was introduced. This was two obols a day, which, despite not being a substantial amount of money, was enough to encourage even the poorest to become a juror. This was later increased to three obols a day by Cleon.

The law courts in Athens were different and diverse: as time changed they changed too.  They originated from the Council of the elite and wealthy who were in charge and ended up being open to any free male who was in the army.  Athens valued justice and they had many different reforms as different challenges arose.  The Athenian law court was large and decisions were made by majority.  The courts could also exile those from society who were gaining too much power and could become tyrants.  The laws of Athens also changed as the courts changed to work better with society.  “The early Greeks were a litigious lot.”

Physical layout
One source says that the Athenian Courts were held in three different buildings.  These three buildings were adjacent to one another and formed a triangle of open space.  All three buildings were spacious which allowed for many people to observe the trial.  The three buildings are referred to as buildings A, B, and C. “Law court A, roofed colonnade; Law court B, rectangular hall; and Law court C, a rectangular hall.  Law courts A and B shared a wall and were across from Law Court C.  Excavations of the area have found a ballot box near the Eastern part of building B, next to building A.” Other sources say that depending on the court its location would change.  The courts were around the Agora sometimes and other times, like in a serious case against an official still in office, they were held on the Pnyx which was an open area on a hill.  The courts were very large as there were many members of the jury so finding a single building to hold everyone was sometimes difficult.
Different scholars say that there were different areas where the trials took place.  The trials were diverse in their matters, public and private, and the courts were diverse in their makeups (number of jurors).  Most of the trials took place in the main part of the city, the Agora, but some happened throughout the city and surrounding area.  Many Athenians would attend trials and participate regardless of the weather.

Makeup of the court
Athens at the beginning of its existence was ruled by a king and a very small group of people called Archons.  They made the decisions and served for life.  Slowly things began to change as the group which was in power widened, included more people, and they did not serve for a lifetime.  Things radically changed when Draco implemented his reforms which made it so that any male who could afford full armor could participate in politics.  This greatly changed the court as now “common men” could serve on it and could bring forth a case if their rights had been violated.  Solon also brought about reforms, and he kept the Council the ruling body at the time of politics and judicial matters, with four hundred members, a hundred from each tribe.  The Council was the most powerful organization and would remain so until after the Persian invasion and more reforms did away with most of the power of the Council.  There was further turmoil, however, as people tried to seize power until Cleisthenes made ten tribes where each would send fifty members to the council.  Each tribe had no links to the others.  After the Persian invasion the Council of Areopagus, still composed of the very wealthy, slowly lost power and the law courts were established as they took over many of the jobs the Council had exercised.
These law courts consisted of many jurors who were male and over the age of thirty; most of which were farmers.  The amount was different for each trial but was around several hundred to several thousand.  This was to prevent corruption as the belief was that no one would be able to bribe several hundred jurors.   They had an odd amount of jurors to prevent a tie and the jurors were picked by lot.

Murder

“Murder was the most troubling crime to Athenians.”  When a person was murdered, it seemed to cast a pollution or be a fault of society.  A murder was considered a two-part crime: one offense being the victim's family and the other being the gods.  The entire community was involved and it was very troubling spiritually to the Athenians.  Extreme attention was paid to the case to find the murderer to expel them from society so society could be cleansed.  The Council of Areopagus, even after losing much of its other power, was still in charge of murder trials.  There was a big problem when no person was convicted of the murder.  The trial was sent to a different and special court.  If this court could not find the person responsible they would blame the weapon.  The Athenians would then exile the weapon to help restore society.

Exiling
The Athenians had a way to remove or exile a person from society if they had gained too much power to prevent tyranny.  It was not entirely successful in preventing tyrants though.  On a certain day in the winter, citizens would come and they had the opportunity to exile an individual.  There were ten gates in the Agora, the main building, each gate for a different tribe.  The people would come and write a name on an ostracism.  If over six thousand ostracism had the same name on them the person would have to leave Athens within ten days.  There have been archeology findings that have uncovered many of the shards of ostracism.

Decisions
The decisions of the courts were not originally based on laws.  They came from the injured party trying to compensate for their loss.  Around 621 BC, under the rule of Dracon, the first written laws came about.  He was a reformer who made the first written laws and the laws were considered very harsh.  The word draconian came about from these laws which often gave out death as a punishment even for small crimes.  Dracon felt that people guilty of small infractions of the law deserved the death penalty.  There also came about a distinction of Athenians from all others with his reforms as, “murdering a non-Athenian, for instance, incurred a lesser penalty.” These laws did not last long, not because they led to the rebellion of the people outraged over them, but because of the gap between rich and poor.  Different families were quarreling and the rich were only concerned with having the poor pay the debt they owed and the poor were concerned with repaying the debt.15  People then turned to Solon to make the changes because he, “owed no one and no one owed Solon anything.”  He was given almost complete control over the process and both sides appealed to him to help them.  Solon canceled all of the debts the poor owed and did other things to solve the problem.  He also implemented legal reforms, the biggest of which he got rid of Draco's laws except for those about murder.  Solon also allowed for the poor to be members of the jury, also, any male could bring forth a case.  The laws the Solon made were numerous and covered all parts of life and society.

References

Athenian democracy
Ancient Greek law